Women's Day may refer to:

Media
 Woman's Day, a U.S. magazine published since 1931
 Woman's Day (Australian magazine), published since 1953

Holidays
 International Women's Day on March 8
 National Woman's Day, a predecessor of International Women's Day in the United States
 National Women's Day, celebrated in South Africa on August 9
 The Combined Holidays of Women's Day and Children's Day, celebrated in Taiwan on April 4
 Sepandārmazgān, "Women's day" or "Nurses day" in Iran

Other uses
 Women's day massacre, an incident in Youngstown, Ohio on 19 June 1937
 Women's One Day International, a limited overs form of women's cricket

See also
Women's Sunday, suffragette march in London on 21 June 1908
Girls' Day (disambiguation)